The Adorno family was a noble family of the Republic of Genoa, with the branches of Botta in Milan, several of whom were Doges of the republic.
The family is considered one of the most influential in the history of the republic.

The elder branch was extinct in 1634, and the titles, fiefdoms and surname were inherited by the Botta family of Milan, which has since been called Botta Adorno. The Botta family has been attested since 1298, with the progenitor Simone Botta, a citizen of Cremona. The Botta Adorno became extinct in 1882. 

They were generally rivals of the Fregoso family. Both families rose to power in the late 14th century.

Origins

History

Family tree

Notable members 
 Lanfranco Adorno, grandfather of Gabriele Adorno.
 Daniele Adorno, father of Gabriele Adorno

Doges of the Republic of Genoa 
Gabriele Adorno (1320-1398), the 4th Doge of the Republic of Genoa.
Antoniotto Adorno (1340-1398), the 6th Doge of the Republic of Genoa.
Giorgio Adorno (1350-1430), the 17th Doge of the Republic of Genoa.
Raffaele Adorno (1375-1458), the 29th Doge of the Republic of Genoa.
Barnaba Adorno (1385-1459), the 30th Doge of the Republic of Genoa.
Prospero Adorno (1428-1486), the 34th Doge of the Republic of Genoa.
 Agostino Adorno (1488-1499)
Antoniotto II Adorno (c. 1479-1528), the 45th Doge of the Republic of Genoa.

Castles and palaces
 Castello di Borgo Adorno
 Castello della Pietra
 Castello di Gabiano
Castello di Bolzaneto
 Castello Adorno in Silvano d'Orba
Castelletto di Branduzzo
 Castello di Savignone
 Palazzo Adorno of Lecce
 Palazzo Adorno of Genoa
 Palazzo Cattaneo Adorno in Genoa
 Palazzo baronale di Caprarica of Lecce
 Palazzo Adorni Braccesi in Firenze

Cultural references 
The first of the Adorno doges, Gabriele Adorno, is also the tenor role in Giuseppe Verdi's opera Simon Boccanegra.

See also
Doge of Genoa
Republic of Genoa
Fregoso

References

Republic of Genoa families